Jaegir is a science fiction strip in the British comic 2000 AD, created by writer Gordon Rennie and artist Simon Coleby. It follows the adventures of Kapitan-Inspector Atalia Jaegir, who serves in the Nordland State Security Police.

Publication history
Jaegir is a spin-off of Rogue Trooper, and was created by writer Gordon Rennie and artist Simon Coleby. Rennie wished to explore the Norts who he felt were underdeveloped in the Rogue Trooper series. Rennie initially pitched Jaegir as a man named Armand Jaegir, and late in the process he decided it would be much more interesting to have a female protagonist with a new personal history.
Jaegir first appeared in 2000 AD in Prog 1874 (March 26, 2014) in a six-part story entitled Strigoi exploring the unsuccessful attempts to genetically engineer prominent Nort families.

Plot synopsis
Set in the future, an ongoing war between the Norts and Southers is being fought. During the conflict, many forms of chemical and biological weapons have been used, poisoning many of the soldiers and the planets. Kapitan-Inspector Atalia Jaegir is a Nort whose role is to hunt down escaped Nort war criminals.

Bibliography

Collected editions
 Jaegir: The Beast Within collects "Strigoi", "Circe", "Brothers in Arms" and "Tartarus" (released September 2015).

References

External links
 The 2000 AD ABC #51: Jaegir
 Jaegir #1 Preview at CBR

2000 AD comic strips
Military science fiction comics